Maruo (written: 丸尾) is a Japanese surname. Notable people with the surname include:

, Japanese manga artist
, Japanese voice actress from Japan

See also
Maruo Station, a railway station in Yamaguchi Prefecture, Japan

Japanese-language surnames